Mervin C. Tweed, MP (born August 6, 1955 in Medora, Manitoba) is a retired politician in Manitoba, Canada. He represented Brandon—Souris in the House of Commons of Canada from 2004 to August 31, 2013. Prior to that he was a member of the Legislative Assembly of Manitoba from 1995 to 2004, representing the constituency of Turtle Mountain. He was the president of Omnitrax, the American rail company responsible for the Churchill rail line.

Tweed was born in Medora, Manitoba, and was educated at Brandon University. He operated a used car dealership for seventeen years, and was for a time an executive member of the Killarney and Area Recreation Committee.

Municipal politician

Tweed began his political career in municipal politics, serving as a councillor in the rural municipality of Brenda for five years, and as deputy reeve for three. Tweed returned to municipal politics in 2021 after being elected mayor of the Municipality of Killarney-Turtle Mountain

Provincial politician (1995-2004)

In 1995, he was elected to the Manitoba legislature as a Progressive Conservative in Turtle Mountain, a safe seat for the party. He served as a parliamentary assistant to a variety of ministers in the government of Premier Gary Filmon before being appointed Minister of Industry, Trade and Tourism with responsibility for the Development Corporation Act on February 5, 1999.

Tweed was easily re-elected in the 1999 provincial election, although the Progressive Conservatives were defeated at the provincial level by the New Democratic Party under Gary Doer. Tweed resigned his cabinet portfolio with the rest of the Filmon ministry.

Despite the NDP's landmark election win of 2003, Tweed was again re-elected in Turtle Mountain without difficulty, receiving 3,956 votes against 1,893 for New Democrat Lonnie Patterson.

Federal politician (2004-2013)

When federal Conservative MP Rick Borotsik (Brandon—Souris), announced his retirement in 2004, Tweed resigned his provincial seat and won the Conservative nomination for the riding. He received 18,209 votes in the general election, against 8,522 for Liberal Murray Downing.

Following the 2004 election, Tweed was named opposition critic for Western Economic Diversification by Conservative leader Stephen Harper. In April 2006, Tweed was elected chairperson of House of Commons of Canada's Standing Committee on Transport, Infrastructure and Communities, a post he held until September 25, 2012 when he was elected chairperson of the Standing Committee on Agriculture and Agri-food. His resignation took effect on August 31, 2013. Tweed went on to work as President of OmniTRAX Canada, which operates, amongst others, the Port of Churchill.

Electoral record

References

External links
 Merv Tweed
 How'd They Vote?

1955 births
Brandon University alumni
Conservative Party of Canada MPs
Living people
Members of the House of Commons of Canada from Manitoba
People from Westman Region, Manitoba
Progressive Conservative Party of Manitoba MLAs
21st-century Canadian politicians